"Stir Fry" is a song by American hip hop group Migos. It was released on December 20, 2017, as the second single from Migos' third studio album Culture II (2018). Written alongside producer Pharrell Williams, it peaked at number eight on the Billboard Hot 100.

Background and composition
"Stir Fry" differs from Migos' traditional Atlanta-style trap sound. In an interview with Beats 1's Ebro Darden, the group revealed the instrumental for the song was originally intended for an unreleased T.I. song in 2008. Quavo stated that "Pharrell said that he was waiting for this moment."

The song was used for the 2018 NBA All-Star Weekend.

Critical reception
Pitchfork gave the song a positive review saying that, "The song's interlocking polyrhythms—bongos, cricket-like whistles, clicking trap hi-hats, and slowed-down snares sampled from the Mohawks' "Champ"—are a beauty to behold. It's a disorienting maze of sounds, a beat that's difficult to wrap your head around, let alone rap over."

Music video
The music video was released on January 28, 2018. Directed by Sing Lee and Quavo, the video features the trio dressed in silk brocade suits gambling in a Chinese restaurant with Pharrell Williams and Nigo. At the end of the video, the trio  clash with an opposing gang.

Migos also created a cooking themed music video with BuzzFeed Tasty depicting the trio making a stir fry dish.

Personnel
Credits adapted from Tidal.
 Pharrell Williams – production
 Colin Leonard – master engineering
 DJ Durel – engineering
 Mike Larson – engineering
 Thomas Cullison – engineering
 Thomas "Tillie" Mann – mixing
 Leslie Braithwaite – mixing

Charts

Weekly charts

Year-end charts

Certifications

Release history

References

2017 songs
2017 singles
Migos songs
Songs written by Quavo
Songs written by Takeoff (rapper)
Songs written by Offset (rapper)
Songs written by Pharrell Williams
Capitol Records singles
Motown singles
Song recordings produced by Pharrell Williams